Moncton/McEwen Airport  is a private aerodrome located adjacent to and north of the City of Moncton, New Brunswick, Canada. The centre  of the runway is asphalt and the facility is often used for sport parachute jumping.

See also
 Moncton/Greater Moncton International Airport

References

Registered aerodromes in New Brunswick
Buildings and structures in Moncton
Transport in Moncton